Dąbie  is a village in the administrative district of Gmina Bytów, within Bytów County, Pomeranian Voivodeship, in northern Poland.

The village has a population of 188.

Notable people 
 Szimón Krofey (1545-1590), pastor and publisher of Kashubian-language Lutheran texts

References

Villages in Bytów County